The 2009–10 Kansas State Wildcats men's basketball team represented Kansas State University in the 2009–10 NCAA Division I men's basketball season. The head coach was Frank Martin, who served his 3rd year at the helm of the Wildcats. The team played its home games in Bramlage Coliseum in Manhattan, Kansas.  Kansas State is a member of the Big 12 Conference.  The Wildcats began conference play with a trip to Columbia, Missouri and faced the Missouri Tigers and finished the year with a home game against the Iowa State Cyclones.  They finished the season 29–8 and ranked #7 in the AP Poll and the ESPN/USA Today Coaches' Poll.  They lost to the rival Kansas Jayhawks in the finals of the Big 12 tournament, 72–64.

The team received a #2 seed for the 2010 NCAA Division I men's basketball tournament, and beat North Texas and BYU to advance to the Sweet Sixteen, where the Wildcats faced Xavier.  The KSU-Xavier game was a double-overtime thriller won by Kansas State 101-96, which CBSSports.com called "one of the best games in the history of the Sweet 16."  Kansas State lost in the next round to Butler.

Recruiting
The following is a list of the recruits that are on the 2009-10 roster.

Schedule

|-
!colspan=9 style=| Exhibition

|-
!colspan=9 style=| Regular Season

|-
!colspan=9 style=| <span style=>Big 12 tournament

|-
!colspan=9 style=| NCAA tournament

Record breaking season

Kansas State earned its highest ranking since the 1987–88 season on December 14, as the Wildcats jumped into The Associated Press Top 25 poll for the first time this season at No. 17.  K-State also appeared in the ESPN/USA Today poll at No. 22.  The team had been receiving votes in both polls since the preseason.  The Wildcats are ranked for the first time in the AP poll since the 2007–08 season when the squad was ranked No. 24 on Feb. 19, 2008.  K-State appeared in the poll eight times during the season, including 18th twice on Nov. 20, 2007 and Feb. 12, 2008.  The last time the team was ranked as high or higher than 17th was during the 1987-88 when the Wildcats were 14th on Feb. 9, 1988.  It is also the highest ranking prior to conference play since K-State was ranked No. 14 in the preseason poll in 1975.

On December 21, Kansas State's rise in the polls reached historical levels, as the Wildcats earned their highest ranking in nearly 36 years on Monday at number 12 in The Associated Press Top 25.  Those rankings marked the first ranking since the 2007-08 season when the team checked in at number 24 on Feb. 19, 2008.  It is the highest ranking in the AP poll since head coach Jack Hartman led the Wildcats to a number 9 ranking in the poll on March 13, 1973, with a 23-5 record.  In addition, it is the highest ranking prior to conference play since K-State was ranked No. 10 in the preseason poll in 1965.   The two wins over ranked non-conference teams are a first since the 1958-59 squad knocked off number 4 N.C. State (69-67) and number 14 St. Joseph's (68-55) on consecutive days on Dec. 19-20, 1958.  The eight 80-point games after 11 games are the most in school history.

With the win over Cleveland State on December 29, the Wildcats moved to 12-1 on the season and are off to their best start since the 1958–59 squad also began 12-1. Also, the last time a K-State team won nine games in a row was back in 1997-98, when that squad won its first nine games of the season.

On January 12, Kansas State beat Texas A&M 88-65.  The victory set a new record for consecutive home wins at Bramlage Coliseum with 13.  The school record for consecutive home victories is 20, which occurred in Ahearn Fieldhouse that stretched from January 1981 to January 1982.

On February 15, Kansas State rose to a number 7 ranking.  It is the highest in The Associated Press poll in almost 50 years since the Wildcats were ranked sixth on March 13, 1962.  It is the highest ranking in the Coaches' poll since USA Today took over ownership of the poll in 1991-92.

The Wildcats have now been ranked among the nation's Top 25 in both polls for 10 consecutive weeks, while they have been ranked among the AP Top 15 for seven straight weeks.  It is the longest stretch in the Top 25 since ranking 16 consecutive weeks in the AP poll from 1972–73, while it is the longest stretch in the AP Top 15 since the 1961–62 team was among the Top 10 for 14 weeks in a row from Dec. 19, 1961 to March 13, 1962.  Kansas State is off to its best start in nearly 50 years with a 20-4 overall mark.   The record ties for the fifth-best start in school history and the best since the 1961–62 squad opened the year at 21-3.  The team posted their 20th win of the season against Colorado on 13 February, becoming the first team to tally 20 or more wins in four consecutive seasons.  Head coach Frank Martin also became the first head coach to post three 20-win seasons to start a career.  It is also the earliest a K-State squad has won 20 games, surpassing the 1958-59 team that won its 20th game on Feb. 16, 1959.

Rankings

Roster

References

Kansas State
Kansas State Wildcats men's basketball seasons
Kansas State
Wild
Wild